Clint is a 2017 Indian  Malayalam-language biographical film on Edmund Thomas Clint, a child prodigy known for having drawn over 25,000 paintings during his short life of seven years. It was directed by Harikumar, starring Master Alok, Rima Kallingal, Unni Mukundan, Joy Mathew and K. P. A. C. Lalitha.

Summary
Clint is the story of a wonder kid who was tragically curtailed by kidney failure.

Cast

Master Alok as Clint
Rima Kallingal as Chinnamma
Unni Mukundan as M. T. Joseph
Vinay Forrt as Artist Mohan
Renji Panicker as Writer V. K. Nambiar
Joy Mathew as Doctor
K. P. A. C. Lalitha as Onamma
Salim Kumar
Akshara Kishor as Ammu
Riaz M. T. as Hero office friend

Soundtrack

The music composed by Ilaiyaraaja and the audio was unveiled on 21 July 2017.

Release
The film was released in India on 11 August 2017. It was premiered on Flowers TV during Onam after a month of its theatrical release.

Reception
Mathrubhumi wrote that the film should be watched to know more about the amazing talent Clint and the film will haunt the audience as the face of Clint, with colour palette follows you. The vacuum created by Clint's death is unbearable and the film is special for the same reason. Manorama said that it is the responsibility of audience to promote this small, but beautiful film with many touching scenes not to get drowned in the crowd of commercial potboilers. Mangalam wrote that the director Harikumar has made a simple, emotional and believable film of an unusual life.

Festivals

23rd Kolkata International Film Festival- Official Selection
20th International Children's Film Festival India (ICFFI)- Official Selection
16th Pune International Film Festival- Official Selection
16th Dhaka International Film Festival- Official Selection
10th Bengaluru International Film Festival- Official Selection

References

External links
 

2017 films
2010s Malayalam-language films
Indian biographical films
Films scored by Ilaiyaraaja